Burui/Kunai Rural LLG is a local-level government (LLG) of East Sepik Province, Papua New Guinea. Ndu languages are spoken in this LLG.

Wards
01. Moi
02. Bangwinge/Manja
03. Jama No 1
04. Jama No 2
05. Sengo (Sengo language speakers)
06. Buruwi (Burui language speakers)
07. Maiwi
08. Bensin
09. Kwimba
10. Kasimbi
11. Aurimbit
12. Wereman
13. Yanget
14. Wakiput
15. Torembi No 1
16. Torembi No 3
17. Numagua 1
18. Selei
19. Miambe
20. Worimbi
21. Kembiam
22. Marap 1
23. Marap 2
24. Nagusap
25. Gaiborobi

References

Local-level governments of East Sepik Province